Under Capricorn is a 1983 Australian miniseries based on the novel by Helen Simpson.

It was financed by the South Australian Film Corporation.

References

External links

1980s Australian television miniseries
1984 Australian television series debuts
1984 Australian television series endings
Television shows set in colonial Australia